Hour of Music, also known as The Commonwealth Bank's Hour of Music, is an Australian television series which aired from 1959 to 1960 on Sydney station ATN-7. It featured classical music. The third episode featured singers Stuart Harvey, Marjorie Conley and Geoffrey Chard, as well as violinist Maurice Stead. Each episode featured the ATN Orchestra led by Thomas Tycho. Originally aired in a 60-minute time-slot, towards the end of the run the episodes aired in an unusual 45-minute time-slot. The live series usually aired on Sundays.

References

External links
Hour of Music on IMDb

1959 Australian television series debuts
1960 Australian television series endings
Black-and-white Australian television shows
English-language television shows
Australian music television series
Seven Network original programming